The Arabic letter  (  or ) is the nineteenth letter of the Arabic alphabet, one of the six letters not in the twenty-two akin to the Phoenician alphabet (the others being , , ,), it represents the sound  or . In name and shape, it is a variant of ʻayn. Its numerical value is 1000 (see Abjad numerals). In the Persian language, it represents ~ and is the twenty-second letter in the new Persian alphabet.

A voiced velar fricative  or a voiced uvular fricative  (usually reconstructed for Proto-Semitic) merged with ʻayin in most languages except for Arabic, Ugaritic, and older varieties of the Canaanite languages. Canaanite languages and Hebrew later also merged it with ʻayin, and the merger was complete in Tiberian Hebrew. Biblical Hebrew, as of the 3rd century BCE, apparently still distinguished the phonemes ġ /ʁ/ and ḫ /χ/, based on transcriptions in the Septuagint.

The letter  is preferred in the Levant (nowadays), and by Aljazeera TV channel to be used to represent  e.g. هونغ كونغ (Hong Kong) and غاندالف (Gandalf). Foreign publications and TV channels in Arabic, e.g. Deutsche Welle, and Alhurra, follow this practice. It is then often pronounced , not , though, in many cases,  is pronounced in loanwords as expected (not ).

The same applies to coastal Yemen, as well as southwestern and eastern Oman.

When representing the sound in transliteration of Arabic into Hebrew, it is written as ע׳.

In English, the letter  in Arabic names is usually transliterated as ‹›, ‹›, or simply ‹g›:   'Baghdad', or   'Gaza', the latter of which does not render the sound ~ accurately. The closest equivalent sound to be known to most English-speakers is the Parisian French "r" .

 is written in several ways depending on its position in the word:

Character encodings

See also
 ڠ
Arabic phonology
Cyrillic Ghayn, used for several Central Asian languages

References

Arabic letters